Aleksandra Nacheva (born 20 August 2001 in Plovdiv), is a Bulgarian athlete who competes in long jump and triple jump.

Career
During the 2017 season, Nacheva won silver at the 2017 IAAF World U18 Championships in Nairobi, Kenya and finished 4th at the European Athletics U20 Championships in Grosseto, Italy.

At the 2018 European Athletics U18 Championships, Nacheva won silver in triple jump with 13.88m, behind Spaniard María Vicente with 13.95m. On 15 July 2018 she won gold in triple jump at the 2018 IAAF World U20 Championships, becoming the first Bulgarian athlete to win in the age group since Tezdzhan Naimova in Beijing 2006. Her result of 14.18m was a personal best and the world leading for the year so far. She became the second Bulgarian female triple jumper to win the Junior world title, after Tereza Marinova, whose 14.62m result in Atlanta 1996 remains the world record.

On 16 October 2018 Nacheva won gold in triple jump at the 2018 Summer Youth Olympics in Buenos Aires, scoring a total of 27.62m in the two-stage final - 13.76m and 13.86m, respectively. This meant that she had won a medal in each of the three major youth athletics events held during 2018. Nacheva received further recognition during the 2018 Bulgarian Sportsperson of the Year award ceremony held on December 20, after being ranked in 3rd place, after winner Taybe Yusein and runner-up Mirela Demireva.

Personal best
Results were last updated on 16 October 2018.

Competition record

Awards
 Bulgarian Sportsperson of the Year - 3rd place (2018)

References

External links
 

 

2001 births
Living people
Bulgarian female long jumpers
Bulgarian female triple jumpers
Athletes (track and field) at the 2018 Summer Youth Olympics
Sportspeople from Plovdiv
World Athletics U20 Championships winners
Youth Olympic gold medalists for Bulgaria
Youth Olympic gold medalists in athletics (track and field)
21st-century Bulgarian women